Willard "Bill" Hammer (July 15, 1919 – December 14, 2003) was an American football player and coach.  He served as the head football coach at Iowa State Teachers College—now known as the University of Northern Iowa–in Cedar Falls, Iowa from 1958 to 1959 and at the University of California at Santa Barbara from 1960 to 1962, compiling a career college football coaching record of 16–29–1.

Head coaching record

References

1919 births
2003 deaths
American football guards
Northern Iowa Panthers football coaches
Springfield Pride football coaches
Springfield Pride football players
UC Santa Barbara Gauchos football coaches
People from Flathead County, Montana
Players of American football from Montana